Georgios Kamaras Stadium is a multi-purpose stadium in Athens, Greece.  It is currently used mostly for football matches and is the home stadium of Apollon Smyrnis.  The stadium holds 14,200 and was built in 1948. It was used by Olympiacos for about 2 years (2002–2004) as home ground, due to the construction of their new stadium Karaiskaki. Since 2005. the stadium is named Georgios Kamaras, in honour of Georgios Kamaras, old glorious player of Apollon.

History
The stadium was built in 1948 and its inauguration took place on October 17th that year with the presence of some 10,000 fans. In 2002, Olympiacos undertook a radical renovation to use it as the temporary headquarters of its team until the construction of the new "Georgios Karaiskakis Stadium" was completed, replacing the old one in Neo Faliro, Piraeus. In 2003, Rizoupoli Stadium took its name in honor of former renowned footballer Apollon Smyrnis, Giorgos Kamaras. The stadium was one of the official training sessions for the 2004 Olympic Games. In 2005 the stadium was used as the headquarters of the National Piraeus team.

The capacity of the stadium is 14,200 seats. The spectators' record was recorded in 1973 in a match between Apollon Smyrnis and PAS Giannina with 21,231 fans on the pitch.

References

External links 
 Georgios Kamaras Stadium information (in English) 

Football venues in Greece
Sports venues in Athens
Multi-purpose stadiums in Greece
Olympiacos F.C.
Apollon Smyrnis F.C.